René Roy may refer to:
 René Roy (economist)
 René Roy (chemist)
 René Roy (astronomer)